The MacIntosh Forts are a group of seven observation posts built in Hong Kong between 1949 and 1953 at the border with China, to safeguard the border against illegal immigrants, when there was an influx of refugees from China due to political instability. The Forts were named after Hong Kong Police Commissioner Duncan William MacIntosh (in office, 1946-1953) who decided to build a chain of observation posts guarded day and night. They have been listed as Grade II historic buildings since 1997.

Description
The MacIntosh Forts were built along the Sham Chun River when an influx of Chinese refugees was followed by border incidents of armed clashes between the police and refugees. Amongst the refugees were the defeated remnants of the Kuomintang Nationalist armies and also a "fair number of common criminals". The Forts were built in reinforced concrete of the same style and of very similar design, which may be categorised as Modern Utilitarian. Built on hilltops at strategic spots, with a view across the border, they were dubbed the Macintosh Cathedrals because of their distinctive appearance and outline against the skyline. Six out of the seven Forts are now remotely controlled. They are not open to public.

List
The seven observation posts are located in a chain, covering most parts of the land frontier. They are from east to west:

Photo Gallery
Other photos of the forts

See also
 Historic police buildings in Hong Kong

References

External links

 
 Survey on Features with Cultural Heritage Value in the Sha Tau Kok, Ta Kwu Ling and Ma Tso Lung Areas, 17 December 2007 (with maps showing the location of the Forts)

Hong Kong Police Force
British Hong Kong
Grade II historic buildings in Hong Kong
North District, Hong Kong
Yuen Long District